Peter Henriksen (born 20 August 1972) is a former   Danish team handball player (goalkeeper). He is European Champion by winning the 2008 European Men's Handball Championship with the Danish national handball team.   He received a bronze medal at the 2007 World Men's Handball Championship.

Henriksen's last club was the Danish Handball League side FHK (Fredericia Håndbold Klub)

References

1972 births
Living people
Danish male handball players
Olympic handball players of Denmark
Handball players at the 2008 Summer Olympics
Handball players from Copenhagen